Yvamara Xagely Rodríguez Mendoza (born 21 June 1992) is a footballer who plays as a midfielder for Altitude FC in League1 British Columbia. Born in Canada, she plays for the Panama women's national team.

Early life
Rodríguez was born in Montreal, Quebec to Panamanian parents.

University career
In 2010, she began attending Kwantlen Polytechnic University, playing for the women's soccer team. In 2011, she was named a league Second Team All-Star.

In 2013, she played for the Simon Fraser Clan of Simon Fraser University.

Club career
She played senior amateur soccer with Surrey United SC. In 2017, she scored the only goal in a 1-0 victory to win the Provincial Cup. She was part of the squad that won the Provincial Cup again in 2018.

In 2022, she signed with Rivers FC in League1 British Columbia and was awarded top defensive player of the year by the club.

In February 2023, she joined Altitude FC in League1 British Columbia.

International career
In August 2011, she earned her first callup to the Panama U20 for the 2012 CONCACAF Women's U-20 Championship qualification tournament. In February 2012, she was called up for the 2012 CONCACAF Women's U-20 Championship.

In February 2022, she was called up to the Panama senior team for the first time, for the 2022 CONCACAF W Championship qualification tournament. She made her debut on February 20 against Belize.

References

External links

1992 births
Living people
People with acquired Panamanian citizenship
Panamanian women's footballers
Women's association football midfielders
Panama women's international footballers
Soccer players from Montreal
Canadian people of Panamanian descent
Sportspeople of Panamanian descent
League1 British Columbia players
Rivers FC players
Altitude FC (Canada) players